Angelika Overath (born 17 July 1957 in Karlsruhe) is a German author and journalist.

Overath studied German literature, History, Italian Studies, and Cultural Studies at the University of Tübingen and wrote a PhD-thesis in 1986 about the colour blue in modern literature.

She regularly works as Writer in Residence for the German Section in the School of Modern Languages, Newcastle University, and at Queen Mary's College, London. She also teaches creative writing for the Swiss Hyperwerk and has founded the Schreibschule Sent which offers seminars in creative writing both in German and Rumantsch.

Prizes 

1996 Egon-Erwin-Kisch Prize for literary reportage
2002/2003 One-year scholarship of the Deutscher Literaturfonds, Darmstadt
2005 Thaddäus-Troll Prize
2006 Ernst-Willner-Prize at the Ingeborg-Bachmann-Competition
2007/2008 Writer in Residence at Queen Mary and Westfield College London 
2008 Swiss prize for independent journalism
2009 Longlist for the German Book Prize by the Börsenverein Deutscher Buchhandel
2009 Shortlist for the Swiss Book Prize

Books 

Das andere Blau, Zur Poetik einer Farbe im modernen Gedicht. (1987) Stuttgart: Metzler.
Händler der verlorenen Farben. (1998) Lengwil: Libelle.
Vom Sekundenglück brennender Papierchen. (2000) Lengwil: Libelle.
Schlimme Ehen. Ein Hochzeitsbuch, aus vielen Quellen zusammengetragen. together with Manfred Koch. (2000) Frankfurt: Eichborn.
Spatzenweisheit. together with Horst Munzig. (2001) Freiburg: Herder.
Mussenpraat. Dutch translation by Annette van Schoonhoven. (2003) Amsterdam: Palet Gifts. .
Schlaflos: das Buch der hellen Nächte. together with Manfred Koch. (2002) Lengwil: Libelle.
Die Kunst des Einfachen. together with Manfred Koch. (2000) Freiburg: Herder.
Toleranz. together with Navid Kermani and Robert Schindel. (2003) Göttingen: Wallstein.
Das halbe Brot der Vögel. (2004) Göttingen: Wallstein.
Generationen-Bilder. (2005) Lengwil: Libelle.
Nahe Tage. novel (2005) Göttingen: Wallstein. / (2008) Munich: dtv.
Genies und ihre Geheimnisse. 100 biographische Rätsel. together with Manfred Koch and Silvia Overath (2007) Berlin: List.
Hunde mitzubringen ist erlaubt: Ein literarischer Salon. together with Manfred Koch. (2008) Berlin: List.
Genies und ihre Geheimnisse, Band 2. 100 neue biographische Rätsel. together with Manfred Koch and Silvia Overath. (2009) Berlin: List.
Flughafenfische. novel. (2009) Munich: Luchterhand.
Short interview with the author about the genesis of the book and the difficulties translating her.
Alle Farben des Schnees. Senter Tagebuch. (2010) Munich: Luchterhand.
English review in New Books in German
Rumantsch and German Interview in Televisiun Rumantscha
Sie dreht sich um. Munich: Luchterhand 2014,  [Excerpt http://www.randomhouse.de/leseprobe/Sie-dreht-sich-um-Roman/leseprobe_9783630873497.pdf], dedicated to Henrike Lähnemann
Ein Winter in Istanbul. Munich: Luchterhand 2018, translation of a short extract in the Fortnightly Review
So träume und verschwinde ich. Liebesgedichte von Edip Cansever, Cemal Süreya und Turgut Uyar. Türkisch-Deutsch, herausgegeben und übersetzt zusammen mit Nursel Gülenaz, btb München 2021, ISBN 978-3-44271757.
Krautwelten. Insel Bücherei 1504, Suhrkamp 2021, .
Schwarzhandel mit dem Himmel/ Marchà nair cul azur. Gedichte Deutsch/Vallader. Telegramme Verlag, Zürich 2022, .

References

External links 
 

1957 births
Living people
20th-century German women writers
21st-century German women writers
German women novelists
German journalists
German women journalists